Chevra may refer to one of the following

"Society" in Hebrew
Chevra Kadisha, Jewish burial society
Chevra Shas, Talmud study group
"The Chevra", a band led by Eli Gerstner
A traditional Indian snack called Bombay mix in the UK and Ireland